Jannat is an Indian television serial that aired on DD Metro channel in 2001 and later moved to Star Plus in the same year from December 2001 to 2002.

The show was a Muslim family drama produced by Sanjay Khan, which revolved around Jannat (Kahkashan Patel) and her family.

Plot 
Jannat adores her cousin Naaz (Lata Sabharwal), married to Aman Khan (Siraj Mustafa Khan) for over three years. Unable to conceive, Naaz is harassed by her mother-in-law. The serial explores the strength and personality of Jannat as she helps Naaz deal with the problem. With several twists and turns, the story portrays the strength of character of a Muslim girl.

Jannat was about to get engaged, but decides to help Naaz by marrying Aman and giving them a child. Her friend Mehendi marries her fiancé.

Cast 
 Kahkashan Patel as Jannat
 Lata Sabharwal as Naaz Sayed / Naaz Aman Khan
 Siraj Mustafa Khan as Aman Khan
 Vaquar Shaikh as Jannat's fiance
 Amar Talwar as Zaheer Sayed, Naaz's father, and Jannat's uncle
 Manini Mishra as Mehendi
 Suvarna Jha
 Anil Dhawan 
 Nayan Bhatt
 Dina Pathak
 Sonia Sahni

References 

DD Metro original programming
StarPlus original programming
2001 Indian television series debuts
2002 Indian television series endings